Sahvir Wheeler (born January 17, 2001) is an American college basketball player for the Kentucky Wildcats of the Southeastern Conference (SEC). He previously played for the Georgia Bulldogs.

Early life and high school career
Wheeler was born in Harlem, New York and grew up in Houston, Texas. He attended Houston Christian High School, where he averaged 19 points, nine assists and seven rebounds per game as a senior. Wheeler originally committed to playing college basketball for Texas A&M but reopened his recruitment after head coach Billy Kennedy was fired. He later committed to Georgia, choosing the Bulldogs over Iowa State. Wheeler was considered a four-star recruit by most services.

College career

Georgia 
As a freshman at Georgia, Wheeler averaged nine points and 4.5 assists per game. He set a program freshman record with 139 assists. In his sophomore season, Wheeler assumed a leading role with the departure of Anthony Edwards. On February 23, 2021, he recorded the first triple-double in program history, with 14 points, 13 assists and 11 rebounds in a 91–78 win over LSU. As a sophomore, Wheeler averaged 14 points, an SEC-leading 7.4 assists and 3.9 rebounds per game. He was a consensus Second Team All-SEC selection and set the program single-season record for assists.

Kentucky 
On May 17, 2021, Wheeler announced he would transfer to Kentucky. Wheeler put up a game high 26 points in a 98–69 victory over North Carolina. Wheeler had a career high 14 assists in a 86–52 win vs North Florida. He was named to the Second Team All-SEC. Wheeler was named a finalist for the Bob Cousy Award.

Career statistics

College

|-
| style="text-align:left;"| 2019–20
| style="text-align:left;"| Georgia
| 31 || 17 || 27.3 || .472 || .320 || .699 || 2.5 || 4.5 || .8 || .0 || 9.0
|-
| style="text-align:left;"| 2020–21
| style="text-align:left;"| Georgia
| 26 || 26 || 34.8 || .399 || .225 || .738 || 3.8 || 7.4 || 1.7 || .0 || 14.0
|-
| style="text-align:left;"| 2021–22
| style="text-align:left;"| Kentucky
| 30 || 29 || 31.2 || .441 || .308 || .780 || 2.6 || 6.9 || 1.1 || .1 || 10.1
|- class="sortbottom"
| style="text-align:center;" colspan="2"| Career
| 87 || 72 || 30.9 || .432 || .275 || .735 || 2.9 || 6.1 || 1.2 || .0 || 10.9

References

External links
Kentucky Wildcats bio
Georgia Bulldogs bio

Living people
2001 births
American men's basketball players
Basketball players from New York (state)
Basketball players from Houston
Georgia Bulldogs basketball players
Kentucky Wildcats men's basketball players
People from Harlem
Point guards